The Edward H. Haskell Home for Nurses, also known as the New England Baptist Hospital Training School For Nurses, is a historic academic complex in the Mission Hill neighborhood of Boston, Massachusetts.  Its original building, a 1-1/2 to -story brick-faced wood-frame building, was designed by Edward Sears Read in the Jacobethan style and built in 1922.  This building originally housed a dormitory and classrooms.  In 1931 a large wing gave the building an L shape, and another series of additions in 1940 gave the complex its present appearance, surrounding a courtyard atop Parker Hill.  The complex was converted into an assisted-living facility in 2002.

The property was listed on the National Register of Historic Places in 2004.

See also
National Register of Historic Places listings in southern Boston, Massachusetts

References

Residential buildings completed in 1922
Residential buildings in Boston
Residential buildings on the National Register of Historic Places in Massachusetts
National Register of Historic Places in Boston
Roxbury, Boston